Ole Bjørnmose (May 7, 1944 – September 5, 2006) was a Danish football player. He spent 11 seasons in the Bundesliga with Werder Bremen and Hamburger SV.

Honours
Hamburger SV
 UEFA Cup Winners' Cup: 1976–77
 DFB-Pokal: 1975–76

External links
 
 

1944 births
2006 deaths
Footballers from Odense
Danish men's footballers
Association football midfielders
Association football forwards
Denmark international footballers
Denmark under-21 international footballers
Bundesliga players
Boldklubben 1909 players
SV Werder Bremen players
Hamburger SV players
Danish expatriate men's footballers
Danish expatriate sportspeople in Germany
Expatriate footballers in Germany